Nicholas Doumanis is a historian of Europe and the Mediterranean world. Born in Australia in 1964, he studied at the University of Sydney and the University of New South Wales, where he acquired his PhD. Nicholas is currently an Associate Professor of History at the University of New South Wales, and has lectured in European history at Macquarie University and the University of Newcastle. Nicholas is a recipient of the Stanley J. Seeger Fellowship at Princeton University.
Doumanis was awarded the Fraenkel Prize (London) in Contemporary European History for Myth and Memory in the Mediterranean. He has since published: Italy, Inventing the Nation which was translated into Italian by Il Mulino press: Una Facia Una Razza, and more recently A History of Greece covering the span of paleolithic to contemporary Greece. His latest book is Before the Nation with Oxford University Press. Nicholas is currently editing The Oxford Handbook of Europe 1914-1945 and writing a history of the Eastern Mediterranean from the Bronze Age to the present for Wiley Blackwell in its History of the World series. 
Doumanis is the Founder and Director of the Greek-Australian Archive of NSW, Australia. Nicholas is also a member of the Australian Committee for the restitution of the Parthenon Marbles. Doumanis is also an Australian Research Council Fellow at the University of Sydney, and was the former Senior Editor of The Journal of Religious History.

Bibliography

 Nicholas Doumanis & Antonis Liakos, The Edinburgh History of the Greeks, 1909 to 2012: A Transnational History, Edinburgh University, Edinburgh, 2021.

Before the Nation: Muslim-Christian Coexistence and Its Destruction in Late-Ottoman Anatolia (Oxford: Oxford University Press, 2013)
A History of Greece (Essential Histories Series) (UK: Palgrave Macmillan, 2009)
Italy (Inventing the Nation) (London and New York: Arnold and Oxford University Press, 2002)
Una Facia Una Razza(Il Mulino, 2003)
Myth and Memory in the Mediterranean: Remembering Fascism's Empire (London and New York: Macmillan and St. Martin's Press, 1997),
'The Ottoman Empire' The Age of Empires  Robert Aldrich (ed), (Thames and Hudson, 2007), pp. 26–43
'Europe and the Wider World' Robert Gerwath (ed), Twisted Paths: Europe 1915-1945 (Oxford University Press, Oxford, 2007), pp. 355–80
'Durable Empire: State virtuosity and social accommodation in the Ottoman Mediterranean', The Historical Journal 49.3 (2006), pp, 953-66
'History Writ Large', Australian Journal of Politics and History, 51.1 (2005), pp. 114–124
'Trading Patterns, The Mediterranean', Berkshire Encyclopaedia of World History, edited by William H. McNeill, (Boston, 2005), pp. 1870–73
'Italians as "Good" Colonizers',Ben Ghiat and Mia Fuller (eds), Italian Colonialism (Palgrave, 2005), pp. 221–232
'The Greeks in Australia', in Richard Clogg (ed.), The Greek Diaspora in the Twentieth Century (Macmillan, London, 1999), pp 58–86
‘The Italian Empire and brava gente: Oral History and the Dodecanese Islands, in R.J.B. Bosworth and Patrizia Dogliani (ed), Italian Fascism: History, Memory and Representation (Macmillan, London, 1999), pp. 161-77
 'Grand History in Small Places: Social Protest on Castellorizo (1934)', Journal of Modern Greek Studies, 15.1 (1997), pp. 103–123
'Eastern Orthodoxy and Migrant Conflict', Journal of Religious History 17.1 (1992), pp 60–77

References

 SBS Radio - Greek Festival of Sydney interview with Themis Kalos May 2010
 Review of A History of Greece in Law Society Journal

External links
 Academia.edu Academia.edu
 UNSW http://hist-phil.arts.unsw.edu.au/staff/nicholas-doumanis-38.html Nicholas Doumanis at UNSW
 A History of Greece Interview with Phillip Adams ABC Radio National May 2010
 ABC Radio - Before the Nation interview on Encounter Presented by Kerry Stewart July 2013

1964 births
Living people
Australian historians